Grant Township is one of the thirteen townships of Sherman County, Kansas, United States.  The population was 115 at the 2000 census.

Geography
Located in the northwestern corner of the county, along the Colorado border, it borders the following townships:
Jaqua Township, Cheyenne County — north, west of Benkelman Township
Benkelman Township, Cheyenne County — north, east of Jaqua Township
Wano Township, Cheyenne County — northeast
Voltaire Township — east
Logan Township — southeastern corner
Lincoln Township — south
Stateline Township — southwest
Kit Carson County lies across the Colorado border to the west.

It lies northwest of the county seat of Goodland.  There are no communities in the township.

Several intermittent headwaters of Beaver Creek, a tributary of the Republican River, are located in Grant Township.

Transportation
Only local roads are located in Grant Township.  A small airport, Wright International Airport, lies in the township's southwest.

Government
As an active township, Grant Township is governed by a three-member board, composed of the township trustee, the township treasurer, and the township clerk.  The trustee acts as the township executive.

References

External links
County website

Townships in Sherman County, Kansas
Townships in Kansas